Marzena Sowa (born 1979 in Stalowa Wola) is a Polish cartoonist. Since 2001, she has been living in France. Sowa studied at the Jagiellonian University in Kraków and then at the Michel de Montaigne University Bordeaux 3 in Bordeaux.

Sowa is the author of the autobiographical comic Marzi, a series of comics about her childhood in 1980s-era Poland. She writes about life under communism, food shortages, and her childish escapades. The illustrator is Sylvain Savoia, Sowa's life partner. So far, six volumes of Marzi have been published by comic book publisher Dupuis. In Poland, the first three volumes were collected and published by Egmont. Marzi is also translated into Spanish, in 2011 into English and in 2012 into Czech.

Books 
 Marzi:
Petite Carpe, vol. 1, Dupuis, 2005
 Sur la terre comme au ciel, vol. 2, Dupuis, 2006
 Rezystor, vol. 3, Dupuis, 2007
 Le Bruit des villes, vol. 4, Dupuis, 2008 (tirage de tête, Éditions de la Gouttière, 2008)
 Pas de liberté sans solidarité, vol. 5, Dupuis, 2009
 Tout va mieux..., vol. 6, Dupuis, 2011
 Nouvelle vague, vol.7, Dupuis, 2017
 La Pologne vue par les yeux d'une enfant (complete volume 1), Dupuis, 2008
 Une enfant en Pologne (complete volume 2), Dupuis, 2009
Nouveau souffle (complete volume 3), Dupuis, 2017

External links
 Interview with Marzena Sowa and Sylvain Savoia
 Profile at culture.pl

1979 births
Living people
Polish comics artists
Polish female comics artists
Jagiellonian University alumni
People from Stalowa Wola County